Inwood, Warleigh is a 56.9 hectare biological Site of Special Scientific Interest in Wiltshire, notified in 1988.

Although the nearest village is Warleigh in Somerset, the site is in the parish of Monkton Farleigh in Wiltshire.

Sources

 Natural England citation sheet for the site (accessed 07 April 2022)

External links
 Natural England website (SSSI information)

Sites of Special Scientific Interest in Wiltshire
Sites of Special Scientific Interest notified in 1988